Clarence Muse  (October 14, 1889 – October 13, 1979) was an American actor, screenwriter, director, singer, and composer. He was the first African American to appear in a starring role in a film, 1929's Hearts in Dixie. He acted for 50 years, and appeared in more than 150 films. He was inducted into the Black Filmmakers Hall of Fame in 1973.

Life and career

Born in Baltimore, Maryland, the son of Alexander and Mary Muse, he studied at Dickinson School of Law in Carlisle, Pennsylvania for one year in 1908. He left because he believed he could not make a living in law as an African American. He later received an honorary doctorate of laws from Dickinson School of Law in 1978.

By the 1920s Muse was acting in New York during the Harlem Renaissance with two Harlem theatres, Lincoln Players and Lafayette Players. While with the Lafayette Players, Muse worked under the management of producer Robert Levy on productions that helped black actors to gain prominence and respect. In regards to the Lafayette Theatre's staging of Dr. Jekyll and Mr. Hyde, Muse said the play was relevant to black actors and audiences "because, in a way, it was every black man's story. Black men too have been split creatures inhabiting one body.".

Muse moved to Chicago for a while, and then moved to Hollywood. He performed in Hearts in Dixie (1929), the first all-black movie. For the next fifty years, he worked regularly in minor and major roles.  Muse appeared as an opera singer, minstrel show performer, vaudeville and Broadway actor; he also wrote songs, plays, and sketches. In 1943, he became the first African-American Broadway director with Run Little Chillun.

Muse was also the co-writer of several notable songs. In 1931, with Leon René and Otis René, Muse wrote "When It's Sleepy Time Down South", also known as "Sleepy Time Down South". The song was sung by Nina Mae McKinney in the movie Safe in Hell (1931). Later it became a signature song of Louis Armstrong.

He was the major star in The Broken Earth (1936), which related the story of a black sharecropper whose son miraculously recovers from fever through the father's fervent prayer. Shot on a farm in the South with nonprofessional actors (except for Muse), the film's early scenes focused in a highly realistic manner on the physical labor of plowing scenes with black farmers. In 1938, Muse co-starred with boxer Joe Louis in Spirit of Youth, the fictional story of a champion boxer, which featured an all-black cast. Muse and Langston Hughes wrote the script for Way Down South (1939).

Muse performed in Broken Strings (1940), as a concert violinist who opposes the desire of his son to play "swing". During World War II, Muse performed for the USO, including a Negro USO in Riverside, California. From 1955 to 1956, Muse was a regular on the weekly TV version of Casablanca, playing Sam the pianist (a part he had been considered for in the original Warner Brothers film). In 1959, he played Peter, the Honey Man, in the film musical Porgy and Bess.

Muse appeared on Disney's TV miniseries The Swamp Fox. Other film credits include Buck and the Preacher (1972), The World's Greatest Athlete (1973), and as Gazenga's assistant, "Snapper", in Car Wash (1976). His last acting role was in The Black Stallion (1979).

Other
Muse received an honorary doctor of humanities degree from Bishop College in Dallas, Texas, in 1972. He was a member of Phi Beta Sigma fraternity, Omega chapter. Muse died in Perris, California, on October 13, 1979, one day before his 90th birthday and the same day that his final film was released.

Partial filmography

 Election Day (1929, short) as Farina's father
 Hearts in Dixie (1929) as Nappus
 Hallelujah (1929) as Church Member (uncredited)
 Guilty? (1930) as Jefferson
 A Royal Romance (1930) as Rusty
 Honey (1930) as Black Revivalist (uncredited)
 Swing High (1930) as Singer (uncredited)
 Rain or Shine (1930) as Nero
 The Thoroughbred (1930) as Stablehand (uncredited)
 Outside the Law (1930) as Party Guest (uncredited)
 Derelict (1930) as Driver (uncredited)
 Deep South (1930)
 The Last Parade (1931) as Alabam' / Singing Voice of Condemned Man (uncredited)
 Dirigible (1931) as Clarence
 The Fighting Sheriff (1931) as Curfew
 Huckleberry Finn (1931) as Jim
 Secret Service (1931) as Jonas Polk
 Safe in Hell (1931) as Newcastle – the Porter
 The Secret Witness (1931) as Jeff – Building Janitor
 X Marks the Spot (1931) as Eustace Brown
 The Woman from Monte Carlo (1932) as Tombeau
 Prestige (1932) as Nham
 The Wet Parade (1932) as Taylor Tibbs
 Lena Rivers (1932) as Curfew
 Night World (1932) as Tim Washington, the Doorman
 Attorney for the Defense (1932) as Jeff
 Is My Face Red? (1932) as Horatio
 Winner Take All (1932) as Rosebud, the Trainer
 White Zombie (1932) as Coach Driver (uncredited)
 Big City Blues (1932) as Nightclub Singer (uncredited)
 Blonde Venus (1932) as Charlie, the Bartender
 Hell's Highway (1932) as Rascal
 The Cabin in the Cotton (1932) as A Blind Negro
 Washington Merry-Go-Round (1932) as Clarence
 Man Against Woman (1932) as Smoke Johnson
 If I Had a Million (1932) as Death Row Singing Prisoner (uncredited)
 The Death Kiss (1932) as Shoeshine Man (uncredited)
 Frisco Jenny (1932) as Singer (voice, uncredited)
 Laughter in Hell (1933) as Abraham Jackson
 From Hell to Heaven (1933) as Sam – Bellhop
 The Mind Reader (1933) as Sam
 The Life of Jimmy Dolan (1933) as Masseur (uncredited)
 Melody Cruise (1933) as Dock Worker (uncredited)
 The Wrecker (1933) as Chauffeur
 Fury of the Jungle (1933) as Sunrise
 Flying Down to Rio (1933) as Caddy in Haiti (uncredited)
 Massacre (1934) as Sam
 A Very Honorable Guy (1934) as Black Man (uncredited)
 The Personality Kid (1934) as Shamrock
 Operator 13 (1934) as Slave at Medicine Show (uncredited)
 Black Moon (1934) as 'Lunch' McClaren
 The Count of Monte Cristo (1934) as Ali
 Kid Millions (1934) as Native (uncredited)
 Broadway Bill (1934) as Whitey
 Red Hot Tires (1935) as Bud's Truck Partner
 Alias Mary Dow (1935) as 'Rufe'
 So Red the Rose (1935) as Cato
 After the Dance (1935) as Cook (uncredited)
 Harmony Lane (1935) as Old Joe
 The Public Menace (1935) as Janitor (uncredited)
 O'Shaughnessy's Boy (1935) as Jeff
 East of Java (1935) as First Mate Johnson
 Muss 'em Up (1936) as William
 Laughing Irish Eyes (1936) as Deacon
 Show Boat (1936) as Janitor
 The Green Pastures (1936) as Angel (uncredited)
 Spendthrift (1936) as Restaurant Table Captain (uncredited)
 Follow Your Heart (1936) as Choir Leader (uncredited)
 Daniel Boone (1936) as Pompey
 The Broken Earth (1936), a short, extant
 Mysterious Crossing (1936) as Lincoln
 High Hat (1937) as Congo MacRosenbloom
 Jungle Menace (1937) as Lightning – Street Singer
 Deep South (1937, Short)
 Spirit of Youth (1938, also music) as Frankie Walburn
 The Toy Wife (1938) as Brutus
 Prison Train (1938) as Train Steward / Sam
 Secrets of a Nurse (1938) as Tiger
 Way Down South (1939, also writer) as Uncle Caton
 Zanzibar (1940) as Bino
 Sporting Blood (1940) as Jeff
 Maryland (1940) as Rev. Bitters (uncredited)
 That Gang of Mine (1940) as Ben
 Murder Over New York (1940) as Butler
 Chad Hanna (1940) as Henry Prince (uncredited)
 Adam Had Four Sons (1941) as Sam
 The Flame of New Orleans (1941) as Samuel
 Invisible Ghost (1941) as Evans
 Love Crazy (1941) as Robert
 Kisses for Breakfast (1941) as Old Jeff
 Gentleman from Dixie (1941) as Jupe
 Belle Starr (1941) as Bootblack in Saloon (uncredited)
 Among the Living (1941) as Riverbottom Cafe Waiter (uncredited)
 Twin Beds (1942) as George (uncredited)
 Tough As They Come (1942) as Eddie
 Tales of Manhattan (1942) as Grandpa (Robeson sequence)
 The Talk of the Town (1942) as Supreme Court Doorkeeper (uncredited)
 Sin Town (1942) as Train Porter (uncredited)
 Broken Strings (1942) as Arthur Williams
 Strictly in the Groove (1942) as Durham's Valet (uncredited)
 The Black Swan (1942) as Margaret's Servant (uncredited)
 Shadow of a Doubt (1943) as Pullman Porter
 Sherlock Holmes in Washington (1943) as George – Porter (uncredited)
 The Sky's the Limit (1943) as Colonial Club Doorman (uncredited)
 Honeymoon Lodge (1943) as Porter (uncredited)
 Heaven Can Wait (1943) as Jasper, Strabel's Butler (uncredited)
 Watch on the Rhine (1943) as Horace
 Johnny Come Lately (1943) as Butler
 Flesh and Fantasy (1943) as Jeff (uncredited)
 The Racket Man (1944) as George (uncredited)
 Jam Session (1944) as Henry
 Follow the Boys (1944) as Singer (uncredited)
 Stars on Parade (1944) as Carter (uncredited)
 Double Indemnity (1944) as Man (uncredited)
 The Soul of a Monster (1944) as Entertainer (uncredited)
 In the Meantime, Darling (1944) as Henry – Hotel Porter (uncredited)
 San Diego, I Love You (1944) as Porter (uncredited)
 Jungle Queen (1945) as Kyba
 God Is My Co-Pilot (1945) as Frank (uncredited)
 Without Love (1945) as  Porter (uncredited)
 Boston Blackie's Rendezvous (1945) as Hotel Porter (uncredited)
 She Wouldn't Say Yes (1945) as Porter (uncredited)
 Scarlet Street (1945) as Ben – Bank Janitor (uncredited)
 The Thin Man Goes Home (1945) as Porter on Train (uncredited)
 Two Smart People (1946) as Porter
 Night and Day (1946) as Porter (uncredited)
 Affairs of Geraldine (1946) as Porter (uncredited)
 My Favorite Brunette (1947) as Second Man on Death Row (uncredited)
 A Likely Story (1947) as Porter (uncredited)
 Welcome Stranger (1947) as Clarence, Train Waiter (uncredited)
 Joe Palooka in the Knockout (1947) – Smoky
 Unconquered (1947) – Jason
 The Peanut Man (1947) as Dr. George Washington Carver
 King of the Gamblers (1948) as Tom the Porter (uncredited)
 Silver River (1948) as Servant (uncredited)
 An Act of Murder (1948) as Mr. Pope
 The Great Dan Patch (1949) as Voodoo
 Riding High (1950) as Whitey
 County Fair (1950) as Romulus (uncredited)
 Apache Drums (1951) as Jehu
 My Forbidden Past (1951) as Pompey
 She Couldn't Say No (1952) as Diaper Delivery Man (uncredited)
 The Las Vegas Story (1952) as Pullman Porter (uncredited)
 Caribbean Gold (1952) as Quashy
 The Sun Shines Bright (1953) as Uncle Zack
 Jamaica Run (1953) as Mose
 Porgy and Bess (1959) as Peter
 Buck and the Preacher (1972) as Cudjo
 The World's Greatest Athlete (1973) as Gazenga's Assistant
 Car Wash (1976) as Snapper
 Passing Through (1977)
 The Black Stallion (1979) as Snoe

References

Sources
 Sampson, Henry T. Ghost Walks: A Chronological History of Blacks in Show Business, 1865–1910, Scarecrow Press, Incorporated, 1988 – 
 Wintz, Cary D. Encyclopedia of the Harlem Renaissance, Routledge, 2004. 
 Penn, Arthur S. Before the Harlem Renaissance. Collodion Press: New York. 2010.

External links

 
 
 
 

1889 births
1979 deaths
American male film actors
African-American male actors
Male actors from Baltimore
20th-century American male actors
Writers from Baltimore
Dickinson College alumni
20th-century African-American people